Robin Ray (17 September 1934 – 29 November 1998) was an English broadcaster, actor, and musician.

Career
Born Robin Olden, he was the son of Charles Olden, later known as comedian Ted Ray. He was educated at Highgate School and the Royal Academy of Dramatic Art, first appearing as a professional actor in a London production of The Changeling in 1960, and playing small roles in films such as I'm All Right Jack (1959) and A Hard Day's Night (1964), before taking up teaching drama at RADA. In 1966, Ray resigned his post at RADA, to pursue a career in broadcasting.

From 1965 he was the chairman of the new BBC show Call My Bluff and he was a popular regular panel member on the BBC classical music series, Face the Music, which began in 1966. Ray was able to recognise pieces of piano music and name not only the piece and the composer but also the opus number, particularly the Köchel or "K" number of pieces by Mozart. His cheerful manner and boyish good looks made him a great favourite with viewers; he was asked to present other quiz programmes, including Movie Quiz and Film Buff of the Year which ran from 1985 to 1992.

The children's television programme Sounds Exciting, broadcast in 1968, was a musical education series culminating in a final "whodunit" called Dead in Tune with Robin Ray's original story set to the music of Herbert Chappell performed by a chamber group of players from the Leicestershire Schools Symphony Orchestra. Two years later Argo recorded the piece using an ensemble of 45 LSSO players conducted by Herbert Chappell. This LP also included a new commission, George and the Dragonfly, with John Kershaw's words set to the music of Herbert Chappell and narrated by Robin Ray, John Kershaw and Susan Stranks (Robin Ray's wife).

At the age of 45 he wrote the musical Cafe Puccini, which opened at the Wyndham's Theatre in 1986 with musical director William Blezard. In the early 1980s he presented a programme called "Robin Ray's Record Review" on Capital Radio.

In the early 1990s, Ray was one of the first executives hired by the start-up commercial classical music radio station, Classic FM, with which he remained associated from 1991 to 1997. He drew up a list of 50,000 pieces of classical music and rated them for popular appeal, which was the basis for the Classic FM playlist. This list proved to be extremely attractive to similar popular classical music radio stations in other countries and there was a legal dispute between Ray and Classic FM, which Ray won in 1998, as to who was entitled to the copyright in the playlist and ratings.

Personal life and death
Robin married children's TV presenter Susan Stranks in 1960. The couple had a son named Rupert. In 1998, Robin died from lung cancer at the age of 64. Robin's brother Andrew Ray, an actor, died in 2003, also at the age of 64.

Filmography

References

1934 births
1998 deaths
Alumni of RADA
English game show hosts
English radio people
English television presenters
People educated at Highgate School